Franciscus is a Latin given name, originally an epithet meaning "the Frank, the Frenchman". 
It was applied to Saint Francis of Assisi  (1181/82–1226).
Francis had been baptized Giovanni (John); his father was Italian and his mother Provençale (at the time not considered French); his father was on business in France when he was born, and when he returned to Assisi, he began to call his son by the nickname Francesco, in the opinion of G. K. Chesterton possibly because out of a general enthusiasm for all things French, or because of his commercial success in France.
After the canonization of Saint Francis of Assisi in 1228, the custom of naming children after saints led to the popularization of Franciscus as a given name. In the vernaculars of western Europe, the name diversified into the forms Francesco (Italian), Francisco (Spanish and Portuguese), Francesc (Catalan), François (Old French Franceis, whence  English  Francis), Franz (German, whence Hungarian Ferenc, Scandinavian and Dutch Frans); besides Frans, the Latin form remains commonly given in Dutch.

Franciscus may serve as the latinization of any of these given names; conversely, Francis may serve as the anglicization of anyone called Franciscus. 

People called Franciscus include:

As a chosen name
Pope Franciscus (papal name chosen in 2013 by Jorge Mario Bergoglio, born 1936)

As a Latinized name
Franciscus Assisiensis (1181/2–1226), Saint Francis of Assisi
Franciscus Accursius (Francesco d'Accorso; 1225–1293), Italian lawyer
Franciscus de Mayronis (François de Meyronnes; c.1280–1328), French scholastic philosopher
Franciscus de Marchia (Francesco della Marca; c.1290–c.1344), Italian Franciscan theologian and philosopher
Franciscus de Florentia (Francesco Landini; c.1330–1397), Italian composer, organist, singer, poet and instrument maker
Franciscus Monachus (Frans Smunck; c.1490–1565), Brabantian cartographer
Franciscus Irenicus (Franz Friedlieb; 1494–1553), German humanist and historian
Franciscus Bossinensis (fl. 1509–1511), possibly Bosnian lutenist-composer working in Venice
Franciscus Stancarus (Francesco Stancaro; 1501–1574), Italian Catholic priest, theologian, and Protestant convert
Franciscus Titelmannus (Frans Titelmans; 1502–1537), Flemish Franciscan scholar
Franciscus Sonnius (Frans van de Velde; 1507–1576), Dutch theologian and bishop
Franciscus Duarenus (François Douaren; 1509–1559), French jurist and professor of law
Franciscus Portus (Φραγκίσκος Πόρτος; 1511–1581), Greek-Italian Renaissance humanist and classical scholar.
Franciscus Dryander (Francisco de Enzinas; 1518–1552), Spanish classical scholar, translator and Protestant apologist
Franciscus Londariti (Φραγκίσκος Λεονταρίτης; 1518–1572), Crete-born Venetian composer
Franciscus Balduinus (François Baudouin; 1520–1573), French jurist, Christian controversialist and historian
Franciscus Patricius (Francesco Patrizi; 1529–1597), Venetian philosopher
Franciscus Costerus (Frans de Costere; 1532–1619), Brabantian Jesuit, theologian and author 
Franciscus Barocius (Francesco Barozzi; 1537–1604), Italian mathematician, astronomer and humanist
Franciscus Raphelengius (Frans van Ravelingen; 1539–1597), Flemish-born Dutch scholar, printer and bookseller
Franciscus Vieta (François Viète; 1540–1603), French mathematician
Franciscus Junius (the elder) (François du Jon; 1545–1602), Huguenot scholar and theologian
Franciscus Haraeus (Frans Verhaer; 1555–1631), Netherlandish theologian, historian, and cartographer
Franciscus Gomarus (François Gomaer; 1563–1641), Dutch theologian
Franciscus Aguilonius (François d'Aguilon; 1567–1617), Belgian Jesuit mathematician, physicist and architect
Franciscus Dousa (Frans van der Does; 1577–1630), Dutch classical scholar
Franciscus Quaresmius (Francisco Quaresmio; 1583–1650), Italian writer and Orientalist
Franciscus Burgersdicius (Franck Burgersdijk; 1590–1635), Dutch logician
Franciscus Junius (the younger) (1591–1677), Huguenot philologist and art historian
Franciscus Linus (Francis Line; 1595–1675), English-born Jesuit priest and scientist
Franciscus Blancus (Frang Bardhi; 1606–1643), Albanian bishop and author
Franciscus Sylvius (Franz de le Boë 1614–1672), Dutch physician and scientist
Franciscus Bonae Spei (François Crespin; 1617–1677), Belgian Catholic scholastic philosopher
Franciscus a Mesgnien Meninski (François Mesgnien; 1623–1698) French-born Turkologist and Ottoman historian

As a given name
Franciscus van den Enden (1602–1674), Flemish poet, physician, art dealer, philosopher, and teacher of Spinoza
Franciscus de Neve (I) (1606–1681), Flemish history, landscape and portrait painter
Franciscus Mercurius van Helmont (1614–1698), Flemish alchemist and writer
Franciscus "Frans" van Schooten (1615–1660), Dutch mathematician 
Franciscus van der Steen (c.1625–1672), Flemish painter and engraver
Franciscus Carré (c.1630–1669), Dutch painter and draftsman
Franciscus de Neve (II) (1632–aft.1704), Flemish painter and engraver
Franciscus "Frans" Kiggelaer (1648–1722), Dutch botanist and apothecary
Franciscus Gijsbrechts (1649–aft.1677), Flemish Baroque painter
Franciscus Andreas Durlet (1816–1867), Belgian architect, sculptor and printmaker
Franciscus Cornelis "Franz" Donders (1818–1889), Dutch ophthalmologist
Franciscus Kenninck (1859–1937), Dutch Old Catholic Archbishop
Franciscus G.J. "Frans" van Lith (1863–1926), Dutch Jesuit missionary on Java
Franciscus Hermanus Bach (1865–1956), Dutch painter
Franciscus Hubertus "Frans" Schraven (1873–1937), Dutch Catholic Bishop who acted as missionary in China
Franciscus C.M. "Frans" Wijffels (1899–1968), Dutch Minister of Social Affairs
Franciscus Bernardus Jacobus Kuiper (1907–2003), Dutch Indologist
Franciscus Xaverius "Frans" Seda (1926–2009), Indonesian finance minister
Franciscus Xaverius Rocharjanta Prajasuta (1931–2015), Indonesian Roman Catholic bishop and composer
Franciscus Jozef "Frans" Brüggen (1934–2014), Dutch conductor, recorder player and baroque flautist
Franciscus J.M. "Frans" Wiertz (born 1942), Dutch Roman Catholic bishop
Franciscus J. "Frans" Luitjes (1944–1965), Dutch sprinter
Franciscus Wilhelmus Maria Broers (1944–2013), Dutch writer using the pseudonym Jacq Firmin Vogelaar
Franciscus Henri (born 1947), Dutch-Australian musician
Franciscus B.M. "Frans" de Waal (born 1948), Dutch primatologist and ethologist
Franciscus Adrianus "Frans" van Vught (born 1950), Dutch social scientist
Franciscus H.G. "Frank" de Grave (born 1955), Dutch Minister of Defence
Franciscus C.G.M. "Frans" Timmermans (born 1961), Dutch politician and diplomat, Minister of Foreign affairs
Franciscus A.A.J. "Frans" Maasen (born 1965), Dutch cyclist and directeur sportif
Franciscus "Frank" de Boer (born 1970), Dutch football player and manager

As a surname
Hoke L. Franciscus, electronics researcher
James Franciscus (1934–1991), American actor
Steve Franciscus (born 1982), Papua New Guinean rugby player

References

Dutch masculine given names